The Rēzekne is a river of Latvia. It discharges into Lake Lubāns.

See also
List of rivers of Latvia

Rivers of Latvia